Javier Muñoz Jiménez (born 28 February 1995) is a Spanish footballer who plays for SD Eibar as a midfielder.

Club career
Born in Parla, Madrid, Muñoz joined Real Madrid's youth system in 2006, aged 11, after starting out at local side CP Parla Escuela. He finished his youth training period in 2014, being immediately assigned to the C-team in Tercera División.

Muñoz was called up by the reserves in late September 2014, and made his debut for the side in a 0–3 home loss against SD Amorebieta in the Segunda División B. On 1 December he was included in the main squad's 17-man list for a Copa del Rey match against UE Cornellà, and played his first match as a professional on the following day, replacing James Rodríguez in the 63rd minute of the 5–0 home success (9–1 on aggregate).

On 19 July 2017 Muñoz was loaned to Lorca FC, newly promoted to Segunda División, on a one-year deal. Roughly one year later, he signed a three-year contract with Deportivo Alavés, being immediately loaned to Real Oviedo for one year.

Muñoz returned to Alavés for the 2019–20 season, and made his La Liga debut on 21 December 2019, starting in a 1–4 away loss against FC Barcelona. The following 31 January, he moved to CD Tenerife in the second division, on loan until June.

On 18 September 2020, Muñoz moved to CD Mirandés in the second tier, on loan for the 2020–21 campaign. The following 1 July, he agreed to a permanent two-year deal with SD Eibar also in division two.

Career statistics

Club

References

External links
Real Madrid official profile

Living people
1995 births
Spanish footballers
Footballers from the Community of Madrid
Association football midfielders
La Liga players
Segunda División players
Segunda División B players
Tercera División players
Real Madrid C footballers
Real Madrid Castilla footballers
Real Madrid CF players
Lorca FC players
Deportivo Alavés players
Real Oviedo players
CD Tenerife players
CD Mirandés footballers
SD Eibar footballers
Spain youth international footballers